Demetrida dieffenbachii is a species of ground beetle in Lebiinae subfamily. It was described by White in 1843 and is endemic to New Zealand.

References

Beetles of New Zealand
dieffenbachii